Waiting for You is Canadian singer Gordon Lightfoot's 18th original album, released in 1993 on the Reprise Records label.

It was his first album since 1986 and represented a comeback of sorts, since he had stated that East of Midnight would be his last. The album is dedicated to his wife Elizabeth and son Miles. Lightfoot produced the album himself.

It is considered a return to form after his previous two or three outings which had moved more into the adult contemporary genre with greater use of electric guitar and synthesizers.

Track listing
All compositions by Gordon Lightfoot except as indicated.
 "Restless" – 3:36
 "Ring Them Bells" – 2:56 (Bob Dylan)
 "Fading Away" – 3:10
 "Only Love Would Know" – 4:18
 "Welcome to Try" – 4:03
 "I'll Prove My Love" – 3:10
 "Waiting for You" – 3:35
 "Wild Strawberries" – 4:17
 "I'd Rather Press On" – 3:43
 "Drink Yer Glasses Empty" – 3:16

Personnel
 Gordon Lightfoot - vocals, guitar
 Terry Clements - lead guitar
 Rick Haynes - bass
 Mike Heffernan - keyboards
 Barry Keane - drums, percussion

References

External links
Lightfoot.ca Review
Album lyrics and chords

Gordon Lightfoot albums
1993 albums
Reprise Records albums